Subeksha Khada (born Jan 7, 1993 in Kathmandu, Nepal) is a beauty pageant titleholder who was crowned Miss Nepal International 2012 & World Miss University Nepal 2017.  She started her modeling career as a television presenter at the age of 17. She represented Nepal in Miss International 2012, which was held in Japan.

References

1994 births
Living people
People from Kathmandu
Nepalese beauty pageant winners